Dancyville is an unincorporated community in Haywood County, Tennessee, United States. Dancyville is located at latitude 35.408 and longitude -89.294, at the intersection of Tennessee State Route 76 and Tennessee State Route 179, near Interstate 40. The elevation is 404 feet. Dancyville appears on the Dancyville U.S. Geological Survey Map. Haywood County is in the Central Time Zone, and it observes daylight saving time.

References

Unincorporated communities in Haywood County, Tennessee
Unincorporated communities in Tennessee